Taylor Davila (born August 4, 2000) is an American professional soccer player who plays as a midfielder for Rio Grande Valley FC in the USL Championship.

Club career
Davila played with Real So Cal for most of his youth career before moving to the LA Galaxy academy and made an appearance for LA Galaxy II in the United Soccer League during their 2018 season.

Davila plays college soccer at the University of California, Berkeley from 2018 onward.

On February 11, 2021, Davila signed with USL Championship side LA Galaxy II. On February 15, 2023, Davila signed with USL Championship's Rio Grande Valley FC for their 2023 season.

References

External links
 
 

2000 births
Living people
American soccer players
Jewish American sportspeople
LA Galaxy II players
USL Championship players
California Golden Bears men's soccer players
Soccer players from California
Association football midfielders
Rio Grande Valley FC Toros players